Jeanette Lee (born Lee Jin-Hee, Hangul: 이진희, July 9, 1971, in Brooklyn, New York) is a Korean-American professional pool player.  She was nicknamed the Black Widow by her friends because, in spite of her sweet demeanor, she would "eat people alive" when she got to a pool table and always wear black when playing pool.

Career
Lee started playing pool in 1989. She went on to rank as the No. 1 female pool player in the world during the 1990s, and received the Women's Professional Billiard Association (WPBA) Sportsperson of the Year Award in 1998. She was three times runner-up at the World Nine-ball Championships (women's), from 1993–96. In addition to many top finishes on the WPBA Tour, she won the gold medal for the United States at the 2001 World Games in Akita, Japan, and won the ladies' 25,000 winner-take-all Tournament of Champions twice, in 1999 and 2003. Lee also wrote The Black Widow's Guide to Killer Pool.

In 2001, Lee challenged Efren Reyes to a -to-13 exhibition match at nine-ball, in Manila, Philippines, but lost 4-13.

For 2007, she was ranked #4 in Pool & Billiard Magazine's "Fans' Top 20 Favorite Players" poll.

In 2013, Lee was inducted into the Billiard Congress of America Hall of Fame.

Titles and achievements
 2015 Asian Hall of Fame
 2013 Billiard Congress of America Hall of Fame
 2013 WPBA Hall of Fame
 2013 Four Bears Classic 8-Ball 
 2007 Billiards Digest Sports Most Powerful Person 
 2007 Skins Billiards Championship
 2007 Team Cup Championship
 2007 Empress Cup Championship
 2005 Billiards Digest Sports Most Powerful Person 
 2005 China Invitational Championship
 2004 Atlanta Women's Open
 2004 ESPN Ultimate Challenge
 2004 Ladies Trick Shot Challenge
 2004 WPBA Florida Classic Hard Rock Casino 
 2003 Billiards Digest Sports Most Powerful Person 
 2003 Tournament of Champions
 2001 Billiards Digest Sports Most Powerful Person 
 2001 World Games Nine-ball Singles 
 2001 BCA Open Nine-ball Championship
 1999 ESPN Ultimate Shootout
 1999 Tournament of Champions
 1998 WPBA Sportsperson of the Year
 1998 WPBA Penn Ray Classic
 1998 WPBA Cuetec Cues Hawaii Classic
 1997 WPBA Huebler Classic
 1997 WPBA Olhausen Classic
 1996 WPBA BCA Classic
 1995 WPBA Olhausen Classic
 1995 WPBA Brunswick Classic
 1994 Billiards Digest Player of The Year
 1994 Mosconi Cup
 1994 WPBA U.S. Open 9-Ball Championship
 1994 WPBA Baltimore Billiards Classic
 1994 WPBA Kasson Classic
 1994 WPBA San Francisco Classic
 1994 WPBA National Championship
 1994 Connecticut State Championship
 1993 North East Regional 
 1993 WPBA Connecticut Classic

Outside competition
As someone who has suffered from scoliosis, Lee is a strong supporter of those affected by the disease, and now serves as the national spokesperson for the Scoliosis Association. Lee appeared on Fox Sports Net's Sport Science, where she  12 balls in one trick shot, on March 30, 2008. Orange County Choppers built the Black Widow Bike in Lee's honor on the TV show American Chopper.

Personal life 
Lee lives in Tampa, Florida, with her three daughters. In February 2021, she announced that she had been diagnosed with stage IV terminal ovarian cancer. In May 2022 it was reported that her chemo treatments were “successful  A documentary about her life directed by Ursula Liang, "Jeanette Lee Vs." premiered at the DOC NYC film festival on November 12, 2022. The film is part of the acclaimed ESPN series 30 for 30. The film had its television debut on December 13, 2022, on ESPN.

References

External links

 http://www.blackwidowbilliards.com/ Jeanette Lee's Official Website
 https://www.pabsa.org/ Pan American Billiards & Snooker Association
 https://web.archive.org/web/20130305114903/http://blackwidowbilliards.co.kr/ Jeanette Lee's Official Website (Korea)
 https://www.facebook.com/jeanetteleetheblackwidow
 https://www.twitter.com/JeanetteLeeTBW
 WPBA Profile
 Jeanette Lee Photo Gallery
 Onthesnap.com Biography (Courtesy of archive.org)
 Press Release for the Black Widow Billiards Center
 Video of Jeanette Lee on Xtreme Presbox (exclusive)
 Video interview 2 with Jeanette Lee at Inside POOL Magazine
 Press Release on the birth of her daughter Savannah
 Jeanette Lee 2008 Derby City Straight Pool Challenge Video

1971 births
Living people
American pool players
Female pool players
Trick shot artists
American sportswomen
American sportspeople of Korean descent
Sportspeople from Brooklyn
World Games gold medalists
Competitors at the 2001 World Games
The Bronx High School of Science alumni
21st-century American women